The effects of climate change on mental health and well-being can be rather negative, especially for vulnerable populations and those with pre-existing serious mental illness. There are three broad pathways by which these effects can take place: directly, indirectly or via awareness. The direct pathway includes stress related conditions being caused by exposure to extreme weather events, such as post-traumatic stress disorder (PTSD). Scientific studies have linked mental health outcomes to several climate-related exposures—heat, humidity, rainfall, drought, wildfires and floods. The indirect pathway can be via disruption to economic and social activities, such as when an area of farmland is less able to produce food. The third pathway can be of mere awareness of the climate change threat, even by individuals who are not otherwise affected by it.

Mental health outcomes have been measured in several studies through indicators such as psychiatric hospital admissions, mortality, self-harm and suicide rates. Vulnerable populations and life stages include people with pre-existing mental illness, Indigenous peoples, children and adolescents. The emotional responses to the threat of climate change can include eco-anxiety, ecological grief and eco-anger. While unpleasant, such emotions are often not harmful, and can be rational responses to the degradation of the natural world, motivating adaptive action.

Assessing the exact mental health effects of climate change is difficult; increases in heat extremes pose risks to mental health which can manifest themselves in increased mental health-related hospital admissions and suicidality.

Pathways

Mental health is a state of well-being where an individual can recognize their abilities, handle daily stresses of life, productively work and be able to contribute to their community. There are three main causal pathways by which climate change impacts mental health: directly, indirectly or via awareness (or "psychosocial"). In some cases, people may be affected via more than one pathway at once. Various studies use different nomenclature to designate the three causal pathways. e.g. some designate the "awareness" pathway using the term "Indirect impact," while grouping "indirect effects" via financial and social disruption under "psychosocial".

Impacts from direct pathway 

The direct pathway includes stress-related conditions being caused by exposure to extreme weather events, such as heat waves, droughts, floods and wildfires. These conditions can result in trauma-related events, such as dislocation from climate-change induced natural disasters, such as flooding or fire, losing friends and family, or other traumatic events. The effect of being exposed to such events can be increased mental health illnesses such as post-traumatic stress disorder and acute stress disorder, depression, and generalized anxiety disorder. These effects often occur simultaneously, as well as individually. A large amount of literature exists concerning the association between disasters and mental health (without explicitly linking an increase in frequency and severity to climate change).

Most commonly this is short term stress, from which people can often soon make a rapid recovery. But sometimes chronic conditions set in, especially among those who have been exposed to multiple events, such as post traumatic stress, somatoform disorder or long term anxiety. A swift response by authorities to restore a sense of order and security can substantially reduce the risk of any long term psychological impact for most people. Though individuals who already had mental ill health, especially psychosis, can need intensive care, which can be challenging to deliver if local mental health services were disrupted by the extreme weather.

Physical health can be severely impacted by climate change (see also effects of climate change on human health). The deterioration of a person's physical health can also lead to a deterioration in a person's mental health.

The less extreme direct manifestations of climate change can also have direct psychological effects. The single most well studied linkage between weather and human behavior is that between temperature and aggression. Various reviews conclude that high temperatures cause people to become bad tempered, leading to increased physical violence.

Increased temperatures and heatwaves 
Several studies have shown that there is a correlation between elevated temperatures and psychiatric hospital admissions for a range of mental and neurological disorders (dementia, mood disorders, anxiety disorders, schizophrenia, bipolar disorder, somatoform disorders, and disorders of psychological development).

Mortality has also been found to be influenced by high ambient temperatures for people living with mental illness and neurological conditions. Another European study supports this finding with increased mortality risk for people with psychiatric disorders during heat waves from 2000 to 2008 in Rome and Stockholm, particularly for older people (75+) and women. Projections of mortality under different climate change scenarios in China also estimate increasing trends in heat-related excess mortality for mental disorders but a decreasing trend in cold-related excess mortality.

Several studies from Asia found that fluctuating temperatures influenced mental health and well-being, impacting productivity and livelihoods. For example, long-term exposure to high and low temperatures in Taiwan resulted in a 7% increase of major depressive disorder incidence per 1 °C increment in regions with an average annual temperature above the median 23 °C.

Suicide rates 
Temperature has also been associated with self-harm and suicide rates. Using data from the US and Mexico, suicide rates were found to increase by 0.7% and 3.1%, respectively, for a 1 °C increase in monthly average temperature. Increasing temperatures are associated with increases in aggressive behavior and rising crime rates, leading to increases in homicides and assaults, as well as increased suicide rates in young men and older adults. Higher ambient temperatures are also associated with emergency department visits for mental health, suicides, and self-reporting of poor mental health. 

It is projected that in the coming decades, suicide rates in the United States and Mexico will increase due to increasing ambient temperatures. Assuming no reduction in the current rate of greenhouse gas emissions, it is projected that by 2050 there will be an additional 9,000 to 40,000 suicides in the United States and Mexico, which is a rate comparable to the one estimated after the impact of economic recessions, suicide prevention programs, and gun restriction laws. The study also showed an increase in depressive language and suicidal ideation used on social media posts correlated with an increase in temperatures. In India, higher temperatures during growing seasons for crops have also been associated with increased suicides, at a rate of an additional 67 deaths per year per 1 °C additional degree.

Wildfires 
Studies from North America have shown that experiences of evacuation and isolation due to wildfires, as well as feelings of fear, stress, and uncertainty, contributed to acute and long-term negative impacts on mental and emotional well-being. Prolonged smoke events were linked to respiratory problems, extended time indoors, and disruptions to livelihood and land-based activities, which negatively affected mental well-being. Similar findings were reported in an Australian study, with increased rates of stress, depression, anxiety and posttraumatic stress disorder being correlated with bushfire exposure severity.

Floods 
An Australian study in rural communities concluded that the threat of drought and flood are intertwined and contributed to decreased well-being from stress, anxiety, loss, and fear. A cohort study from the UK looking at the long-term impact of flooding found psychological morbidity persisted for at least three years after the flooding event.

Increased carbon dioxide concentrations 
Drivers of climate change may also have a physiological effects on the brain, in addition to their psychological impacts. By the end of the 21st century people could be exposed to indoor  levels of up to 1400 ppm, triple the amount commonly experienced outdoors today. This may cut humans' basic decision-making ability indoors by ~25% and complex strategic thinking by ~50% due to carbon dioxide toxicity.

Impacts from indirect pathway 
Climate change can affect wellbeing and mental health also through indirect consequences, such as "loss of land, flight and migration, exposure to violence, change of social, ecological, economic or cultural environment". Indirect effects on mental health can also occur via impacts on physical health. Physical health and mental health have a reciprocal relationship, so any climate change related effect that affects physical health can potentially indirectly affect mental health too.

In several parts of the world, climate change significantly impacts people's financial income, for example by reducing agricultural output. This can cause significant stress, which in turn can lead to depression, suicidal ideation, and other negative psychological conditions. Consequences can be especially severe if financial stress is coupled with significant disruption to social life, such as relocation to camps. Effective government interventions, similar to those used to relief the stress from a financial crisis, can alleviate the negative conditions caused by such disruption.

Having to migrate due to an extreme weather event can lead to increased rates of physical illnesses and psychological distress.

Impacts from increasing awareness pathway 
The third pathway can be of mere awareness of the climate change threat, even by individuals who have not personally experienced any direct negative impacts. This can cause psychological distress, anxiety (eco-anxiety), and grief (eco-grief).

The increasing "awareness of the existential dimension of climate change" can influence people's wellbeing or challenge their mental health, especially for children and adolescents. Awareness for climate change in young people has grown in Europe as evidenced by the “Fridays for Future” movement that started in summer 2018. This can lead to higher emotional distress amongst young people, as well as feelings of fear, sadness, and anger, apocalyptic and pessimistic feelings – which can lead to grief, anxiety and hopelessness – all factors which can impact people's mental health. This effect has been compared to nuclear anxiety which occurred during the Cold War.

Conditions such as eco-anxiety are very rarely severe enough to require clinical treatment. While unpleasant and thus classified as negative, such conditions have been described as valid rational responses to the reality of climate change.

Types of mental health outcomes 
There are a multitude of mental illnesses that affect everyone differently. The types of mental health outcomes that are related to the effects of climate change (for example during heat waves) can be grouped as follows:

 Clinical disorders
 Trauma related disorders
 Post-traumatic stress disorder (PTSD)
 Acute stress disorder
 Depression
 Anxiety
 Self-harm and suicide
 Sub-clinical conditions
 Psychological distress
 Environmental and climate specific constructs
 Climate anxiety (eco-anxiety)
 Solastalgia
 Psychiatric-related hopitalisations and deaths (admissions for mental and neurological disorders, including dementia, mood disorders, anxiety disorders, schizophrenia, bipolar disorder, somatoform disorders, and disorders of psychological development)
 Exacerbation of pre-existing mental illness
 Potential neurodevelopmental impacts

Vulnerable populations and life stages 
Climate change does not impact everyone equally; those of lower economic and social status are at greater risk and experience more devastating impacts.

People with pre-existing mental illness 
Higher temperatures can affect people taking certain psychotropic medications (including hypnotics, anxiolytics, and antipsychotics). They can have an increased risk of heatstroke and death as a result of high temperatures.

Indigenous peoples

Inuit communities 

Qualitative studies reporting the unique mental health impacts of climate change on Inuit communities in Canada have described a loss of place-based solace, land-based activities such as hunting, and cultural identity due to changing weather and local landscapes.

Climate change has devastating effects on Indigenous peoples' psychological wellbeing as it impacts them directly and indirectly. As their lifestyles are often closely linked to the land, climate change directly impacts their physical health and financial stability in quantifiable ways. There is also a concerning correlation between severe mental health issues among Indigenous peoples worldwide and environmental changes. The connection and value Indigenous cultures ascribe to land means that damage to or separation from it, directly impacts mental health. For many, their country is interwoven with psychological aspects such as their identity, community and rituals.

Inadequate government responses which neglect Indigenous knowledge further worsen negative psychological effects linked to climate change. This produces the risk of cultural homogenization due to global adaptation efforts to climate change and the disruption of cultural traditions due to forced relocation. Countries with lower socio-economic status and minority groups in high socio-economic areas are disproportionately affected by the climate crisis. This has created climate migrants due to worsening environmental conditions and catastrophic climate events.

Changes in sea levels and ice formation cause great impacts in Indigenous communities. The changes can lead to shifts in emotions such as anger, fear, anxiety, a sense of loss, etc.; as well as to changes in behavior such as withdrawal, aggression, and increased substance use. A sense of loss due to the changes in traditional weather prediction and navigation techniques has been observed, especially among younger generations where it results in feelings of cultural dislocation and dissociation as well as changes in identity. Climate change is likely to continue affecting Indigenous communities and their mental health for the next decades. Another study indicated that the cumulative effect of repeated exposure to climate change events and related stressors would be likely to lead to some form of mental illness. The effect of climate change on Inuit youth has also been studied, with concern for Elders, reduced connection to the land, challenges to cultural activities, among other things having an effect on mental health on youth.

Indigenous peoples of Australia 

Studies conducted with Aboriginal and Torres Strait Islander peoples from Australia also highlight the environmental impacts of climate change on emotional wellbeing, including increased community distress from deteriorating the connection to country. Heat also appeared to be associated with suicide incidence in Australia's Indigenous populations; however, other socio-demographic factors may play a more critical role than meteorological factors.

Children 

Climate change is a serious threat to children and adolescent mental health. Children's mental health, their rights and climate change need to be seen as interlinked topics, not separate points.

Children and young adults are the most vulnerable to climate change impacts. Many of the climate change impacts which affect children's physical health also lead to psychological and mental health consequences. Children who live in geographic locations that are most susceptible to the impacts of climate change, and/or with weaker infrastructure and fewer supports and services suffer the worst impacts.

The impacts of climate change on children include them being at a high risk of mental health consequences like PTSD, depression, anxiety, phobias, sleep disorders, attachment disorders, and substance abuse. These conditions can lead to problems with emotion regulation, cognition, learning, behavior, language development, and academic performance.

Adolescents 
Lack of political advocacy and change, with an increase in media attention, has brought upon ecological grief, which has had particular impacts on adolescent mental health. Climate change affects adolescents differently and in a multitude of ways. Many of these ways intersect as each adolescent processes their trauma and distress. Adolescents with pre-existing mental illnesses experience an elevated risk of ecological grief and distress.

While these feelings are not directly harmful to the adolescent's physical health and conditions, they are unpleasant and a rising issue. Ecological grief, distress, anxiety, and anger are the most popular emotions sparked among adolescents. Psychologists, specifically climate psychologists, are experiencing difficulties in originating the source of these emotions, and methods to aid those in need and prevent those not as affected.

Being forced to move, or displacement is becoming more common as the climate crisis rises. Forced displacement may be caused by natural disasters, reduction of food or food security, famine, water scarcity, or other environmental impacts. This displacement alone evokes feelings of grief and loss by being forced to move from a place of comfort to someplace unknown. Reduction of food, famine and water scarcity will indirectly impact an adolescent's health by invoking fear and anxiety, as well as grief and loss.

As an adolescent, relationships are important. Displacement can put strains on an adolescent's social relationships, as well as prevent them from further developing their social skills and relationships. Community conflict can also indirectly impact an adolescent's mental health. The community may experience conflicting views on how to approach climate change, climate change methods, and climate change awareness. Surrounded by negative emotions, and situations can heavily way on a developing adolescent. They may not want to personally experience this conflict with others and pull back from social interactions. They may possess different ideas, but struggle to get someone to listen due to their age. Feelings of hopelessness, helplessness, and fear become prevalent.

Environmental and climate-specific constructs

Climate anxiety (eco-anxiety)

Eco-grief

Solastalgia

Co-benefits
While most study on the psychological impact of climate change finds negative effects, there may be some positive impacts via direct or indirect pathways.

Climate activism 
Direct experience of the negative impacts of climate change may also lead to personal changes that can be seen as positive. Direct experiences of environmental events such as flooding have resulted in greater psychological salience and concern for climate change, which in turn predicts intentions, behaviors. and policy support for climate change.

At a personal level, emotions like worry and anxiety are a normal, if uncomfortable, part of life. They can be seen as part of a defense system that identifies threats and deals with them. From this perspective, anxiety can be useful in motivating people to seek information and take action on a problem. Anxiety and worry are more likely to be associated with engagement when people feel that they can do things. Feelings of agency can be strengthened by including people in participatory decision-making. Problem-focused and meaning-focused coping skills can also be promoted. Problem-focused coping involves information gathering and trying to find out what you personally can do. Meaning-focused coping involves behaviors such as identifying positive information, focusing on constructive sources of hope, and trusting that other people are also doing their part. A sense of agency, coping skills, and social support are all important in building general resilience. Education may benefit from a focus around emotional awareness and the development of sustainable emotion-regulation strategies.

For some individuals, the increased engagement caused by the shared struggle against climate change reduces social isolation and loneliness. At a community level, learning about the science of climate change, and taking collective action in response to the threat, can increase altruism and social cohesion, strengthen social bonds, and improve resilience. Such positive social impact is generally associated only with communities that had somewhat high social cohesion in the first place, prompting community leaders to act to improve social resiliency before climate-related disruption becomes too severe.

Mitigation and adaptation efforts
There are potential mental health benefits of mitigation actions taken by individuals, such as active transport, increased physical activity, and healthier diets.

History 
Early investigation of the mental health impacts for climate change began in the 20th century, and became more topical in the 21st.

See also

 Barriers to pro-environmental behaviour
 Climate psychology
 Effects of climate change on human health
 Politics of climate change
 Psychological impact of climate change

References

Effects of climate change
Environmental psychology
Climate change and society
Mental health